John Austin Adey (born 1943), is a male former athlete who competed for England.

Athletics career
He represented England and won a bronze medal in the 4 x 440y relay, at the 1966 British Empire and Commonwealth Games in Kingston, Jamaica.

References

1943 births
English male sprinters
Commonwealth Games medallists in athletics
Commonwealth Games bronze medallists for England
Athletes (track and field) at the 1966 British Empire and Commonwealth Games
Living people
Medallists at the 1966 British Empire and Commonwealth Games